Solanum campechiense, the redberry nightshade, is a plant in the family Solanaceae.

References

External links
 Solanum campechiense L. on Solanaceae Source — Images, description, specimens and a full list of scientific synonyms.

campechiense
Plants described in 1753
Taxa named by Carl Linnaeus